The European Biofuels Technology Platform (BiofuelsTP) is a European Seventh Framework Programme initiative to improve the competitive situation of the European Union in the field of biofuel.

The programme is a joint initiative (Public-Private Partnership) of the European Commission, representing the European Communities, and the industry. The main objective of the programme is to produce a Strategic Research Agenda. The BiofuelsTP initiative was launched at a Conference in June 2006.

See also
 European Technology Platform

References
 Vision report
 Biofuels Technology Platform

External links
 European Biofuels Technology Platform

Bioenergy organizations
Biofuels
European Union and science and technology
Science and technology in Europe